Drosophila repleta is a species of vinegar fly in the family Drosophilidae.
 D. repleta is a carrier of foodborne illness - including Escherichia coli O157:H7, Salmonella Saint Paul, and Listeria innocua - onto human food.

References

Further reading

External links

 Diptera.info

repleta